Rogers High School can refer to:

 Rogers High School (Arkansas), Rogers, Arkansas
 Rogers Heritage High School, Rogers, Arkansas
 Rogers High School, Michigan City, Indiana, now merged into Michigan City High School
 Rogers High School (Wyoming, Michigan)
 Rogers High School (Rogers, Minnesota)
 Rogers High School (Toledo, Ohio)
 Will Rogers High School, Tulsa, Oklahoma
 Rogers High School (Rhode Island), Newport, Rhode Island
 Rogers High School (Rogers, Texas)
 Governor John R. Rogers High School, Puyallup, Washington
 John R. Rogers High School, Spokane, Washington

See also
 George Rogers Clark High School (Kentucky), Winchester, Kentucky
 T. H. Rogers School, Houston, Texas